The 2016 Tula Oblast gubernatorial election took place on September 18, 2016, to elect the governor of Tula Oblast. Election took place concurrently with Federal legislative election and local elections in Single Electoral Day.

Background
Until 2012, the governor of Tula Oblast was not elected, but was appointed by the president of Russia, with the approval of the Tula Oblast Duma. Direct elections were introduced in 2012.

In August 2011, Vladimir Gruzdev became governor. His term expired in August 2016 and he could be elected for a second term; however, Gruzdev resigned from office in February 2016, and Alexey Dyumin became the acting governor until election.

Candidates
Candidates could be nominated by political parties or by self-nomination. To participate in the elections, candidates from the parties had to collect signatures of 7% of municipal deputies and heads of municipalities. Independent candidates, in addition to the municipal filter, still had to collect 2% of the signatures of residents of the region (about 25,000 signatures).

The acting governor, Alexey Dyumin, decided to run for governor as independent candidate, but he was supported by United Russia and Liberal Democratic Party. At the same time, Tula Oblast became the only region in 2016 where the United Russia did not hold a primaries for the selection of a candidate for governor from the party.

According to the law, each candidate had to nominate three candidates for Federation Council, one of whom was to be appointed senator in case of the candidate's victory.

A total of four candidates were registered.

Results
Alexey Dyumin was elected governor in the first round. After the election, Dyumin appointed Dmitry Savelyev as senator.

See also
2016 Russian gubernatorial elections

References

Gubernatorial